The Marina Towers Observatory (also known as the Swansea Observatory and Tower of the Ecliptic) is located in the Maritime Quarter of Swansea, on the coast of southern Wales. It was previously home to Wales's largest optical astronomical telescope. The building was designed by Robin Campbell in 1989 and consists of two towers, it was built with part funding from a European Heritage Grant.  From 1993 to Feb 2010 it was loaned to the Swansea Astronomical Society but it is now back in the hands of Swansea City Council.

The top of the tower has a stained glass feature designed by David Pearl. Observational facilities previously included a 20-inch Shafer-Maksutov telescope - the second largest of its kind in the world. But this has since been removed after Swansea Astronomical Society vacated the site.

References

External links
Swansea Astronomical Society
Explore Gower:Marina Towers - Swansea Observatory

Buildings and structures in Swansea
Astronomical observatories in Wales
Towers completed in 1989
Towers in Wales